Benocyclidine, also known as benzothiophenylcyclohexylpiperidine (BTCP), is a psychoactive recreational drug of the arylcyclohexylamine class which is related to phencyclidine (PCP). It was first described in a patent application naming Marc Caron and colleagues at Duke University in 1997.

It acts as a potent and selective dopamine reuptake inhibitor (DRI) and a psychostimulant. Unlike related compounds like phencyclidine and ketamine, benocyclidine is a pure DRI with negligible affinity for the NMDA receptor, and it therefore lacks any anticonvulsant, anesthetic, hallucinogenic, or dissociative effects. It has been used to label the dopamine transporter. BCP was used to try to find a common pharmacophore for DRI type stimulants.

More recently, benocyclidine has been found in several ecstasy tablets, sold as MDMA.

Legal status in the United States
Benocyclidine is not scheduled at the federal level in the United States, but may be considered an analog of PCP, in which case purchase, sale, or possession could be prosecuted under the Federal Analog Act.

Benocyclidine (BCP) or benzothiophenylcyclohexylpiperidine (BTCP) is a Schedule I controlled substance in the state of Florida, making it illegal to buy, sell, or possess in Florida.

See also
 Tenocyclidine

References

Arylcyclohexylamines
Stimulants
1-Piperidinyl compounds
Benzothiophenes
Dopamine reuptake inhibitors